Herald Samuel Frahm (April 11, 1906 – October 19, 1977) was an American football halfback for the Staten Island Stapletons, the Boston Redskins, and the Philadelphia Eagles of the National Football League and the St. Louis/Kansas City Blues of the 1934 version of the American Football League. He played college football at the University of Nebraska.

References

1906 births
1977 deaths
People from Gage County, Nebraska
Players of American football from Nebraska
American football running backs
Nebraska Cornhuskers football players
Staten Island Stapletons players
Boston Redskins players
Philadelphia Eagles players